The Virginia and Tennessee Railroad was an historic  gauge railroad in the Southern United States, much of which is incorporated into the modern Norfolk Southern Railway. It played a strategic role in supplying the Confederacy during the American Civil War.

Founding and early history

Built in the 1850s, the V&T ran completely through southwestern Virginia along a portion of the Great Valley of Virginia.

After the Virginia government refused to fund its construction (in part because it could adversely affect the James River Canal), the city of Lynchburg incorporated the railroad on March 24, 1848, as the Lynchburg and Tennessee Railroad. John R. McDaniel, who had previously put together the Lynchburg Gas Light Company and who had pledged his fortune to get it built, was its first president. Construction of the road bed began in 1850, and on February 18, 1852, the railroad's first locomotive (the "Virginia") was tested when it steamed out of Lynchburg's James River basin, climbing the nearby low mountains. Regular freight service was initiated not long afterwards. Construction of the railroad's entire length to Bristol was completed on October 1, 1856.

The Virginia and Tennessee stimulated rapid economic growth in the counties through which it ran, and also changed their political alignment to more closely resemble that in Richmond and the Tidewater area, rather than of other Virginia counties in the Appalachian mountain region (much less those in the Ohio River watershed where slavery was much less common and that became West Virginia during the Civil War). Bristol, formerly a small town on the Tennessee border, became a communication and commercial hub. During the 1850-1860 decade, southwest Virginia's population increased, and the proportion of those living in slavery increased 15%.  Thus, while northwestern Virginia elected almost all firm opponents of secession to the Virginia Secession Convention of 1861, the Abingdon Democrat editorialized for secession, only to be disappointed at the number of "wait-a-bit" delegates elected from surrounding counties.

During the Civil War, Robert L. Owen Sr., who had been one of the engineers surveying for the railroad and who had risen through the ranks, succeeded McDaniel as president. The railroad became a key supply, food and troop movement route for the Confederate States Army, particularly from the capital of Richmond to the interior at Chattanooga, Tennessee. The V&T moved also key raw materials: copper from mines near Cleveland, Tennessee, lead from mines near Bristol, salt from Saltville, Virginia and saltpeter from caves throughout the region. Union forces finally captured much of the railroad and destroyed tracks and rolling stock in late 1864, although service was periodically interrupted by a series of cavalry raids earlier in the war.

The Mahone years

After the war, the road was rebuilt and came under the  control of former Confederate general William Mahone, who was already leading the South Side Railroad and the Norfolk and Petersburg Railroad. He was named president of the V&T by the end of 1867. Mahone desired to consolidate the three roads and build further west, and he worked for several years lobbying to get the needed legislation through the Virginia General Assembly.

In 1870, it became part of Mahone's Atlantic, Mississippi and Ohio Railroad. The letters A, M & O were said to stand for "All Mine and Otelia's." The Mahones lived in Lynchburg during this time, but moved to Petersburg in or before 1880.

The A, M & O was initially profitable, but fell victim to the Financial Panic of 1873, like many other southern railroads. Mahone was initially able to placate the English and Scottish bondholders, but the relationship soured in 1875. After several years of operating under receiverships, Mahone's role as a railroad builder ended in 1881 when Northern interests purchased the A, M, & O and renamed it Norfolk and Western.

Mahone was able to arrange for a portion of the state's proceeds of the sale to help found a school to prepare  teachers to help educate black children and former slaves. The Virginia Normal and Collegiate Institute near Petersburg was forerunner of Virginia State College, which expanded to become Virginia State University.

20th Century and modern

Norfolk & Western Railway (N&W) was expanded west into the coalfields and eventually into a much larger system. One hundred years later, the N&W was combined with the Southern Railway, another profitable carrier, to form Norfolk Southern Corporation (NS) in 1982.

Today, much of the former Virginia and Tennessee Railroad remains in service for Norfolk Southern (NS). The Fortune 500 company, headquartered in Norfolk, transports bituminous coal, intermodal freight transport/shipping containers, automobile parts and completed vehicles, and other commodities in the 21st century global transportation markets.

References

External links

 History of Lynchburg
 Library of Congress map of V&T route in 1856

Defunct Virginia railroads
Virginia in the American Civil War
Predecessors of the Norfolk and Western Railway
Railway companies established in 1849
American companies established in 1849
Railway companies disestablished in 1871
5 ft gauge railways in the United States
1849 establishments in Virginia
American companies disestablished in 1871